is a main belt asteroid that undergoes recurrent comet-like activity near perihelion, and is now designated comet . This object was discovered on 29 August 2005 by the Near-Earth Asteroid Tracking program at Palomar Observatory. The orbital plane is inclined at an angle of 0.068° to the ecliptic.

On 7 July 2021,  was found to be active by the Asteroid Terrestrial-impact Last Alert System survey. Archival imagery showed it had been active during a previous perihelion passage, dated 22 July 2016. This indicates the activity is due to the sublimation of icy volatiles, as is common with comets. At the time that activity was identified, the object displayed a long, dusty tail, much like a comet. Follow up observations found this tail extended more than  along its orbital plane. By 14 August 2021, the coma around the nucleus was fading, while the brightness of the tail remained roughly constant.

Its colors are consistent with a dark C-type carbonaceous asteroid taxonomic classification, which is class more commonly found in the outer main belt. This suggests that the dust emission may have been assisted by rapid spin of the asteroid, which would lower the escape velocity.

The asteroid will make its next perihelion passage on 3 September 2026, and it may become active by February 2026.

References

Further reading

248370
Active asteroids
C-type asteroids (Tholen)
0433
248370
248370
20050829